The World Junior A Challenge (WJAC) is an annual under-20 international ice hockey tournament sponsored by Hockey Canada, the Canadian Junior Hockey League (CJHL), and the International Ice Hockey Federation (IIHF). The tournament showcases Junior A level players and is modeled after the IIHF World U20 Championships, which displays the best of all junior-aged hockey players. It has been hosted by Canadian cities every year in CJAHL markets.

The tournament features six teams per year and has seen teams from Canada, the United States, Russia, Sweden, Slovakia, Germany, Switzerland and Belarus. Canada is represented by two regional squads; Canada West consists of players from the British Columbia, Alberta, Saskatchewan, Manitoba, and Superior International Junior Hockey Leagues, while Canada East features players from the Northern Ontario, Ontario, Central, Quebec, and Maritime Junior Hockey Leagues. American players are chosen from the United States Hockey League. Canada West captured the first two gold medals in tournament history, while the United States won the next three.  Also, Russia, who has been with the tournament since the beginning, generally sends their Under-18 Team in place of a general select squad.

History

The tournament was created in 2006 through a proposal by the Canadian Junior A Hockey League (CJHL prior to 2008) to Hockey Canada.  The idea behind the tournament was to showcase players from Canadian Junior "A" to Canadian Hockey League, National Collegiate Athletic Association, and National Hockey League scouts, while also exposing them to an international level and style of play.

The inaugural 2006 tournament was hosted in Yorkton, Saskatchewan, and featured six teams – Canada West, Canada East, Russia, Slovakia, Germany and Belarus. Both Canadian teams met in the final with Canada West defeating Slovakia 7-1 and Canada East defeating Russia 5-1 in their respective semifinals. Led by Kyle Turris, Canada West ran up a 4-0 tally against Canada East early in the game and held on for a 4-3 victory to win the first-ever WJAC championship.

The 2007 tournament was held in Trail, British Columbia. The United States joined the tournament for the first time, replacing Slovakia. For the second straight year, Canada West defeated the East in the final.

Beginning in 2008, the United States began a string of dominance at the tournament. They defeated Canada West in the 2008 (Camrose, Alberta) and 2009 (Summerside, Prince Edward Island) finals before winning their third consecutive title against Canada East in 2010 (Penticton, British Columbia). The 2009 tournament featured newcomers Sweden, who sent a team in place of Germany. That year also marked the first time in tournament history that Canada East failed to medal. At the 2010 WJAC, Switzerland competed in place of Belarus.

The 2013 tournament was won by the United States, 4-1, over Russia.  This instance marked the first time in tournament history that both Canada East and Canada West were shut out of the gold medal game.

In 2014, the tournament was played in late December as opposed to it usually taking place in early November.

Champions

All-time team records

See also
International Ice Hockey Federation
Hockey Canada
Canadian Junior Hockey League
United States Hockey League
Royal Bank Cup
World U-17 Hockey Challenge
IIHF World U18 Championship
IIHF World U20 Championship

References

External links
World Junior A Challenge
Guide and Record Book

 
Hockey Canada
International ice hockey competitions hosted by Canada
International ice hockey competitions for junior teams